The 1913 Armory Show, also known as the International Exhibition of Modern Art, was a show organized by the Association of American Painters and Sculptors in 1913. It was the first large exhibition of modern art in America, as well as one of the many exhibitions that have been held in the vast spaces of U.S. National Guard armories.

The three-city exhibition started in New York City's 69th Regiment Armory, on Lexington Avenue between 25th and 26th Streets, from February 17 until March 15, 1913. The exhibition went on to the Art Institute of Chicago and then to The Copley Society of Art in Boston, where, due to a lack of space, all the work by American artists was removed.

The show became an important event in the history of American art, introducing Americans, who were accustomed to realistic art, to the experimental styles of the European avant garde, including Fauvism and Cubism. The show served as a catalyst for American artists, who became more independent and created their own "artistic language."

"The origins of the show lie in the emergence of progressive groups and independent exhibitions in the early 20th century (with significant French precedents), which challenged the aesthetic ideals, exclusionary policies, and authority of the National Academy of Design, while expanding exhibition and sales opportunities, enhancing public knowledge, and enlarging audiences for contemporary art."

History

On December 14, 1911 an early meeting of what would become the Association of American Painters and Sculptors (AAPS) was organized at Madison Gallery in New York. Four artists met to discuss the contemporary art scene in the United States, and the possibilities of organizing exhibitions of progressive artworks by living American and foreign artists, favoring works ignored or rejected by current exhibitions. The meeting included Henry Fitch Taylor, Jerome Myers, Elmer Livingston MacRae and Walt Kuhn.

In January 1912, Walt Kuhn, Walter Pach, and Arthur B. Davies joined together with some two dozen of their colleagues to reinforce a professional coalition: AAPS. They intended the organization to "lead the public taste in art, rather than follow it." Other founding AAPS members included D. Putnam Brinley, Gutzon Borglum, John Frederick Mowbray-Clarke, Leon Dabo, William J. Glackens, Ernest Lawson, Jonas Lie, George Luks, Karl Anderson, James E.Fraser, Allen Tucker, and J. Alden Weir. AAPS was to be dedicated to creating new exhibition opportunities for young artists outside of the existing academic boundaries, as well as to providing educational art experiences for the American public. Davies served as president of AAPS, with Kuhn acting as secretary.

The AAPS members spent more than a year planning their first project: the International Exhibition of Modern Art, a show of giant proportions, unlike any New York had seen. The 69th Regiment Armory was settled on as the main site for the exhibition in the spring of 1912, rented for a fee of $5,000, plus an additional $500 for additional personnel. It was confirmed that the show would later travel to Chicago and Boston.

Once the space had been secured, the most complicated planning task was selecting the art for the show, particularly after the decision was made to include a large proportion of vanguard European work, most of which had never been seen by an American audience. In September 1912, Kuhn left for an extended collecting tour through Europe, including stops at cities in England, Germany, the Netherlands, and France, visiting galleries, collections and studios and contracting for loans as he went. While in Paris Kuhn met up with Pach, who knew the art scene there intimately, and was friends with Marcel Duchamp and Henri Matisse; Davies joined them there in November 1912. Together they secured three paintings that would end up being among the Armory Show's most famous and polarizing: Matisse's Blue Nude (Souvenir de Biskra) and Madras Rouge (Red Madras Headdress), and Duchamp's Nude Descending a Staircase, No. 2. Only after Davies and Kuhn returned to New York in December did they issue an invitation for American artists to participate.

Pach was the only American artist to be closely affiliated with the Section d'Or group of artists, including Albert Gleizes, Jean Metzinger, Duchamp brothers Marcel Duchamp, Raymond Duchamp-Villon, Jacques Villon and others. Pach was responsible for securing loans from these painters for the Armory Show. Most of the artists in Paris who sent works to the Armory Show knew Pach personally and entrusted their works to him. The Armory Show was the first, and ultimately the only exhibition mounted by the AAPS. 

In 1913, the art collector and lawyer John Quinn fought to overturn censorship laws restricting modern art and literature from entering the United States. He convinced the United States Congress to overturn the 1909 Payne–Aldrich Tariff Act, which retained the duty on foreign works of art less than 20 years old, discouraging Americans from collecting modern European art. Quinn opened the Armory Show exhibition with the words:

The Armory Show displayed some 1,300 paintings, sculptures, and decorative works by over 300 avant-garde European and American artists. Impressionist, Fauvist, and Cubist works were represented. The publicity that stormed the show had been well sought, with the publication of half-tone postcards of 57 works, including the Duchamp nude that would become its most infamous. News reports and reviews were filled with accusations of quackery, insanity, immorality, and anarchy, as well as parodies, caricatures, doggerels, and mock exhibitions. Some responded with laughter, as the artist John French Sloan seemed to not take the exhibition seriously in his published cartoon, "A slight attack of third dimentia brought on by excessive study of the much-talked of cubist pictures in the International Exhibition at New York". About the modern works, former President Theodore Roosevelt declared, "That's not art!" The civil authorities did not, however, close down or otherwise interfere with the show.

Among the scandalously radical works of art, pride of place goes to Marcel Duchamp's cubist/futurist style Nude Descending a Staircase, painted the year before, in which he expressed motion with successive superimposed images, as in motion pictures. Julian Street, an art critic, wrote that the work resembled "an explosion in a shingle factory" (this quote is also attributed to Joel Spingarn), and cartoonists satirized the piece. Gutzon Borglum, one of the early organizers of the show who for a variety of reasons withdrew both his organizational prowess and his work, labeled this piece A staircase descending a nude, while J. F. Griswold, a writer for the New York Evening Sun, entitled it The rude descending a staircase (Rush hour in the subway). The painting was purchased from the Armory Show by Frederic C. Torrey of San Francisco.

The purchase of Paul Cézanne's Hill of the Poor (View of the Domaine Saint-Joseph) by the Metropolitan Museum of Art signaled an integration of modernism into the established New York museums, but among the younger artists represented, Cézanne was already an established master.

Duchamp's brother, who went by the "nom de guerre" Jacques Villon, also exhibited, sold all his Cubist drypoint etchings, and struck a sympathetic chord with New York collectors who supported him in the following decades.

The exhibition went on to show at the Art Institute of Chicago and then to The Copley Society of Art in Boston, where, due to a lack of space, all the work by American artists was removed.

While in Chicago, the exhibition created a scandal that reached the governor's office. Several articles in the press recounted the issue. In one newspaper the headline read: Cubist Art Will be Investigated; Illinois Legislative Investigators to Probe the Moral Tone of the Much Touted Art:

Floor plan

The following shows the content of each gallery:
 Gallery A: American Sculpture and Decorative Art
 Gallery B: American Paintings and Sculpture
 Gallery C, D, E, F: American Paintings
 Gallery G: English, Irish and German Paintings and Drawings
 Gallery H, I: French Painting and Sculpture
 Gallery J: French Paintings, Water Colors and Drawings
 Gallery K: French and American Water Colors, Drawings, etc.
 Gallery L: American Water Colors, Drawings, etc.
 Gallery M: American Paintings
 Gallery N: American Paintings and Sculpture
 Gallery O: French Paintings
 Gallery P: French, English, Dutch and American Paintings
 Gallery Q: French Paintings
 Gallery R: French, English and Swiss Paintings

Legacy

The original exhibition was an overwhelming success. There have been several exhibitions that were celebrations of its legacy throughout the 20th century.

In 1944 the Cincinnati Art Museum mounted a smaller version, in 1958 Amherst College held an exhibition of 62 works, 41 of which were in the original show, and in 1963 the Munson-Williams-Proctor Arts Institute in Utica, New York organized the "1913 Armory Show 50th Anniversary Exhibition" sponsored by the Henry Street Settlement in New York, which included more than 300 works.

Experiments in Art and Technology (E.A.T.) was officially launched by the engineers Billy Klüver and Fred Waldhauer and the artists Robert Rauschenberg and Robert Whitman when they collaborated in 1966 and together organized 9 Evenings: Theatre and Engineering, a series of performance art presentations that united artists and engineers. Ten artists worked with more than 30 engineers to produce art performances incorporating new technology. The performances were held in the 69th Regiment Armory, as an homage to the original and historical 1913 Armory show.

In February 2009, the Art Dealers Association of America (ADAA) presented its 21st annual Art Show to benefit the Henry Street Settlement, at the Seventh Regiment Armory, located between 66th and 67th Streets and Park and Lexington Avenues in New York City. The exhibition began as a historical homage to the original 1913 Armory Show.

Starting with a small exhibition in 1994, by 2001 The Armory Show, now held at the Javits Center, evolved into a "hugely entertaining" (The New York Times) annual contemporary arts festival with a strong commercial bent.

Commemorating the centennial
Many exhibitions in 2013 celebrated the 100th anniversary of the 1913 Armory Show, as well as a number of publications, virtual exhibitions, and programs. The first exhibition, "The New Spirit: American Art in the Armory Show, 1913," opened at the Montclair Art Museum on February 17, 2013, a hundred years to the day from the original. The second exhibition was organized by the New-York Historical Society and titled "The Armory Show at 100," taking place from October 18, 2013 through February 23, 2014. The Smithsonian's Archives of American Art, which lent dozens of historic documents to both the New York Historical Society and Montclair for the exhibitions, created an online timeline of events, 1913 Armory Show: the Story in Primary Sources, to showcase the records and documents created by the show's organizers.

Showing contemporary work, a third exhibition, The Fountain Art Fair, was held at the 69th Regiment Armory itself during the 100th anniversary during March 8–10, 2013. The ethos of Fountain Art Fair was inspired by Duchamp's famous "Fountain" which was the symbol of the Fair. The Art Institute of Chicago, which was the only museum to host the 1913 Armory Show, presented works February 20 – May 12, 2013, the items drawn from the museum's modern collection that were displayed in the original 1913 exhibition. The DePaul Art Museum in Chicago, Illinois presented For and Against Modern Art: The Armory Show +100, from April 4 to June 16, 2013. The International Print Center in New York held an exhibition, "1913 Armory Show Revisited: the Artists and their Prints," of prints from the show or by artists whose work in other media was included.

In addition, the Greenwich Historical Society presented The New Spirit and the Cos Cob Art Colony: Before and After the Armory Show, from October 9, 2013, through January 12, 2014. The show focused on the effects of the Armory Show on the Cos Cob Art Colony, and highlighted the involvement of artists such as Elmer Livingston MacRae and Henry Fitch Taylor in producing the show.

American filmmaker Michael Maglaras produced a documentary film about the Armory Show entitled, The Great Confusion: The 1913 Armory Show. The film premiered on September 26, 2013, at the New Britain Museum of American Art in New Britain, Connecticut.

List of artists

Below is a partial list of the artists in the show. These artists are all listed in the 50th anniversary catalog as having exhibited in the original 1913 Armory show.

 Robert Ingersoll Aitken
 Alexander Archipenko
 George Grey Barnard
 Chester Beach
 Gifford Beal
 Maurice Becker
 George Bellows
 Joseph Bernard
 Guy Pène du Bois
 Oscar Bluemner
 Hanns Bolz
 Pierre Bonnard
 Solon Borglum
 Antoine Bourdelle
 Constantin Brâncuși
 Georges Braque
 Bessie Marsh Brewer
 Patrick Henry Bruce
 Paul Burlin
 Theodore Earl Butler
 Charles Camoin
 Arthur Carles
 Mary Cassatt
 Oscar Cesare
 Paul Cézanne
 Robert Winthrop Chanler
 Pierre Puvis de Chavannes
 John Frederick Mowbray-Clarke
 Nessa Cohen
 Camille Corot
 Kate Cory
 Gustave Courbet
 Henri-Edmond Cross
 Leon Dabo
 Andrew Dasburg
 Honoré Daumier
 Jo Davidson
 Arthur B. Davies (President)
 Stuart Davis
 Edgar Degas
 Eugène Delacroix
 Robert Delaunay
 Maurice Denis
 André Derain
 Katherine Sophie Dreier
 Marcel Duchamp
 Georges Dufrénoy
 Raoul Dufy
 Jacob Epstein
 Mary Foote
 Roger de La Fresnaye
 Othon Friesz
 Paul Gauguin
 William Glackens
 Albert Gleizes
 Vincent van Gogh
 Francisco Goya
 Marsden Hartley
 Childe Hassam
 Robert Henri
 Edward Hopper
 Ferdinand Hodler
 Jean Auguste Dominique Ingres
 James Dickson Innes
 Augustus John
 Gwen John
 Wassily Kandinsky
 Ernst Ludwig Kirchner
 Leon Kroll
 Walt Kuhn (Founder)
 Gaston Lachaise
 Marie Laurencin
 Ernest Lawson
 Henri de Toulouse-Lautrec
 Arthur Lee
 Fernand Léger
 Wilhelm Lehmbruck
 Jonas Lie
 Amy Londoner
 George Luks
 Aristide Maillol
 Édouard Manet
 Henri Manguin
 Edward Middleton Manigault
 John Marin
 Albert Marquet
 Henri Matisse
 Alfred Henry Maurer
 Kenneth Hayes Miller
 David Milne
 Claude Monet
 Adolphe Monticelli
 Edvard Munch
 Ethel Myers
 Jerome Myers (Founder)
 Elie Nadelman
 Olga Oppenheimer
 Walter Pach
 Jules Pascin
 Francis Picabia
 Pablo Picasso
 Camille Pissarro
 Maurice Prendergast
 Odilon Redon
 Pierre-Auguste Renoir
 Boardman Robinson
 Theodore Robinson
 Auguste Rodin
 Georges Rouault
 Henri Rousseau
 Morgan Russell
 Albert Pinkham Ryder
 André Dunoyer de Segonzac
 Georges Seurat
 Charles Sheeler
 Walter Sickert
 Paul Signac
 Alfred Sisley
 John Sloan
 Amadeo de Souza Cardoso
 Joseph Stella
 Felix E. Tobeen
 John Henry Twachtman
 Félix Vallotton
 Raymond Duchamp-Villon
 Jacques Villon
 Maurice de Vlaminck
 Bessie Potter Vonnoh
 Édouard Vuillard
 Abraham Walkowitz
 J. Alden Weir
 James Abbott McNeill Whistler
 Enid Yandell
 Jack B. Yeats
 Mahonri Young
 Marguerite Zorach
 William Zorach

List of women artists

Women artists in the Armory Show includes those from the United States and from Europe. Approximately a fifth of the artists showing at the armory were women, many of whom have since been neglected.

Images

Selected painting and sculpture

Special installation

La Maison Cubiste (Cubist House)

At the 1912 Salon d'Automne an architectural installation was exhibited that quickly became known as Maison Cubiste (Cubist House), signed Raymond Duchamp-Villon and André Mare along with a group of collaborators. Metzinger and Gleizes in Du "Cubisme", written during the assemblage of the "Maison Cubiste", wrote about the autonomous nature of art, stressing the point that decorative considerations should not govern the spirit of art. Decorative work, to them, was the "antithesis of the picture". "The true picture" wrote Metzinger and Gleizes, "bears its raison d'être within itself. It can be moved from a church to a drawing-room, from a museum to a study. Essentially independent, necessarily complete, it need not immediately satisfy the mind: on the contrary, it should lead it, little by little, towards the fictitious depths in which the coordinative light resides. It does not harmonize with this or that ensemble; it harmonizes with things in general, with the universe: it is an organism...". "Mare's ensembles were accepted as frames for Cubist works because they allowed paintings and sculptures their independence", writes Christopher Green, "creating a play of contrasts, hence the involvement not only of Gleizes and Metzinger themselves, but of Marie Laurencin, the Duchamp brothers (Raymond Duchamp-Villon designed the facade) and Mare's old friends Léger and Roger La Fresnaye". La Maison Cubiste was a fully furnished house, with a staircase, wrought iron banisters, a living room—the Salon Bourgeois, where paintings by Marcel Duchamp, Metzinger (Woman with a Fan), Gleizes, Laurencin and Léger were hung—and a bedroom. It was an example of L'art décoratif, a home within which Cubist art could be displayed in the comfort and style of modern, bourgeois life. Spectators at the Salon d'Automne passed through the full-scale 10-by-3-meter plaster model of the ground floor of the facade, designed by Duchamp-Villon. This architectural installation was subsequently exhibited at the 1913 Armory Show, New York, Chicago and Boston, listed in the catalogue of the New York exhibit as Raymond Duchamp-Villon, number 609, and entitled "Facade architectural, plaster" (Façade architecturale).

Sources
 Sarah Douglas. "Pier Pressure." March 26, 2008. Archived on April 11, 2008.
 Catalogue of International Exhibition of Modern Art, at the Armory of the Sixty-Ninth Infantry, Feb 15 to March 15, 1913.  Association of American Painters and Sculptors, 1913.
 Walt Kuhn. The Story of the Armory Show.  New York, 1938.
 Milton W. Brown. The Story of the Armory Show. Joseph H. Hirshhorn Foundation, distributed by New York Graphic Society, 1963. [republished by Abbeville Press, 1988.]
 1913 Armory Show 50th Anniversary Exhibition. Text by Milton W. Brown. Utica: Munson-Williams-Proctor Institute, 1963.
 Walter Pach Papers, Archives of American Art, Smithsonian Institution
 Walt Kuhn, Kuhn Family Papers, and Armory Show Records, Archives of American Art, Smithsonian Institution

See also
 List of artists in the Armory Show
 List of women artists in the Armory Show
 Experiments in Art and Technology
 American modernism
 American realism
 Ashcan school
 Culture of New York City
 The Armory Show (art fair)

References

External links

1913 Armory Show
 The Armory Show at 100: Modern Art and Revolution, The New-York Historical Society
 Smithsonian, Archives of American Art, Walt Kuhn scrapbook of press clippings documenting the Armory Show, vol. 2, 1913. Armory Show catalogue (illustrated) from pages 159 through 236
 Catalogue of international exhibition of modern art Association of American Painters and Sculptors. Published 1913 by the Association in New York
 1913 Armory Show: the Story in Primary Sources, Archives of American Art, Smithsonian Institution
 Virtual re-creation of the Armory Show from the American Studies Programs at the University of Virginia
 Works of art exhibited at the Armory Show of the association of American Painters and Sculptors, New York, Library of Congress
 The Armory Show at 100: Armory Show 1913 Complete List, The New-York Historical Society

Armory shows after 1913
 The "New" Armory Show
 Artkrush.com feature on the 2006 Armory Show (March, 2006)
 2010 Armory Show
 Swann Galleries – The Armory Show at 100 – Exhibition through November 5, 2013
 Armory Show 2014: List of exhibiting galleries

 

Art exhibitions in the United States
Modern art
1913 in art
1913 in New York City
Cultural history of the United States
Culture of New York City
February 1913 events
March 1913 events